The 2017–18 Wellington Phoenix FC season was the club's 11th season since its establishment in 2007. The club participated in the A-League for the 11th time, the FFA Cup for the fourth time, and fielded a reserves squad in the ISPS Handa Premiership for the fourth time.

Players

Squad information

From youth squad

Transfers in

Transfers out

Contract extensions

Technical staff

Statistics

Squad statistics

|-
|colspan="24"|ISPS Handa Premiership contracted players:

|-
|colspan="24"|Players no longer at the club:

Pre-season and friendlies

Competitions

Overall

A-League

League table

Results summary

Results by round

Matches

FFA Cup

ISPS Handa Premiership

League table

Results summary

Results by round

Matches

References

Notes

External links
 Official Website

Wellington Phoenix
Wellington Phoenix FC seasons